Harpullia cauliflora  is a plant in the family Sapindaceae found in New Guinea. It was first described by Karl Moritz Schumann and Carl Adolf Georg Lauterbach in 1900.

References

 

cauliflora
Flora of New Guinea
Plants described in 1900